Josephus ("Jos") Maria Melchior Hermens (born 8 January 1950 in Nijmegen, Gelderland) is a former Dutch long-distance runner. Subsequently, he also became well-known for his later career as a sports manager as the founder and CEO of Global Sports Communication, which manages many Olympian athletes.

Running career
Hermens is a three-time national champion in the men's 5,000 metres, and collected his first title on 14 July 1973 in The Hague. He was named Dutch Sportsman of the Year in 1975. He was a 10,000 metres finalist at the 1976 Summer Olympics and set the world record for the hour run the same year.

Hermens twice improved the world hour record, on the Papendal track. In September 1975, with Gerard Tebroke as a pacemaker, he ran 20,907 meters. In May 1976, without a pacemaker, he ran an additional 37 meters. This record held until 1991.

Hermens had withdrawn from the 1972 Olympic Games following the Munich massacre.  "It's quite simple," he said. "We were invited to a party, and if someone comes to the party and shoots people, how can you stay?"

Sports management career
After his athletic career was cut short by injuries, Hermens worked for Nike, leaving it in 1985 to start his management company, Global Sports Communications. Hermens' company manages in excess of 100 athletes; his current and former clients include Haile Gebrselassie, Eliud Kipchoge, Kenenisa Bekele, Gabriela Szabo, Nils Schumann, and Hezekiél Sepeng.

References

External links

Living people
1950 births
Dutch male long-distance runners
Dutch athletics coaches
Dutch sports executives and administrators
Athletes (track and field) at the 1976 Summer Olympics
World record setters in athletics (track and field)
Olympic athletes of the Netherlands
Sportspeople from Nijmegen
20th-century Dutch people
21st-century Dutch people